The 2018 Liga Sudamericana de Básquetbol (South American Basketball League) was the 23rd edition of the second-tier level continental professional club basketball competition in the Americas, the FIBA Americas League. Sixteen teams from South America competed over three rounds to determine the champion. The defending champions, Guaros de Lara, did not have the opportunity to defend their title, after the Venezuelan Basketball Federation failed to register the team in the competition, alleging financial troubles. Franca of Brazil won their first Liga Sudamericana de Básquetbol championship in team history by beating Instituto of Argentina.

Team allocation

Teams

The labels in the parentheses show how each team qualified for the place of its starting round:
1st, 2nd, etc.: League position after Playoffs
CW: Cup winner
WC: Wild card

Group phase
Sixteen teams participated in the group phase, in which each team faced the other teams in the group once. Each group tournament was held at the arena of a host team. The two highest-placed teams in groups A, C, and D, and the highest-placed team in group B advanced to the semifinal phase. Also, the best third-placed team from groups A, C and D advanced to the semifinal phase. Games were played from 2 to 24 October, 2018.

Group A

Venue: Franca, Brazil

Group B

Venue: Macas, Ecuador

Group C

Venue: Cali, Colombia

Group D

Venue: Montevideo, Uruguay

Best third-placed team

Semifinal phase
The eight teams which advanced from the group phase played in this stage. The eight teams were split into two groups, in which each team faced the other teams in the group once. Each group tournament was held at the arena of a host team. The highest-placed teams in each group advanced to the Grand Final series. Games were played from 13 to 22 November 2018.

Group E

Venue: Asunción, Paraguay

Group F

Venue: Rio de Janeiro, Brazil

Grand Finals
The Grand Finals were decided in a best-of-three playoff format. Games were played on 7, 13, and 14 December 2018. The team with the better record in the Semifinal phase played Games 2 and 3 (if necessary) at home.

|}

References

External links
Official website

2018
2018–19 in South American basketball
2018–19 in North American basketball